The Mohammed Bin Rashid Al Maktoum Creative Sports Award honors individuals, teams and organizations who have made significant sporting contributions in the United Arab Emirates and globally. It is designed to celebrate and promote the best initiatives in projects or programmes in the sporting field, such as Tolerance, Knowledge Management, Empowering Communities and tackling global challenges like the COVID-19 pandemic.

History
The Award, one of the Mohammed bin Rashid Global Initiatives, was launched in 2009 and in 2021 offered Dhs7.5 million (US$2 million) in prize money. The 11th edition of the Award was postponed in 2020 due to the COVID-19 pandemic.

The 2021 award has been used to highlight the role of women in sports. Prominent Middle Eastern female winners of the award have included Moroccan Paralympian Najat El Garaa; Hayat bint Abdulaziz Al Khalifa, Member of the Supreme Council for Youth and Sports, Member of the Board of Directors of the Bahrain Olympic Committee, and Chairperson of the Bahraini Women’s Sports Committee and Reema bint Bandar bin Sultan bin Abdulaziz Al Saud, Ambassador of Saudi Arabia to the United States, who won the Arab Sports Personality of the Award in the 9th Edition. Female members of the Award's Board of Trustees have included Moroccan Olympic champion Nawal El Moutawakel, Dr Mona Al Bahar and Mona Bou Samra, the editor-in-chief of Al Bayan newspaper.

The award maintains links with 204 National Olympic Committees, 178 Paralympic Committees, 33 international sports federations for summer Olympic sports and seven international sports federations for winter Olympic sports, as well as with 69 Arab national Olympic federations and committees, and 34 international federations recognized by the International Olympic Committee. The International category of the award is open to Summer Olympic International Federations.

In 2018, a number of Egyptian athletes were awarded, including footballer Mohammed Salah. International sporting bodies receiving the award have included UWW, ICC and FIFA.

Board of Trustees
Following are the Board of Trustees for the award.

Award Categories
There are three main categories:
Individual Sports Creativity
This award is given to Individuals such as players, coaches, referees, and administrators who have accomplished creative sports achievements on the local, Arab, continental or international level.

Group Sports Creativity
This award is given to sports groups which have achieved creative sports works on the local, Arab, continental or international level.

Corporate Sports Creativity
This award is given to sports institutes which have achieved creative sports works and best initiatives on the local, Arab, continental or international level.

Local Awards
These awards are given to athletes, officials or organisations of United Arab Emirates only.

Best Local Athlete

Best Local Referee

Best Local Coach

Best Local Team

Best Local Administrator

Best Local Organisation

Arab Awards
These awards are given to the athletes of Arab countries.

Best Arab Player

Best Arab Coach

Best Arab Team

Best Arab Organisation

Best International Organisation

Other Awards

2009

2010

References

2009 establishments in the United Arab Emirates
Awards established in 2009
Emirati awards
Asian sports trophies and awards
Annual events in the United Arab Emirates
Sport in the United Arab Emirates